Life's a Gamble is the fourth studio album by Australian band The Radiators. The album was released in December 1984 and peaked at number 47 on the Australian Albums Chart.

Track listing

Charts

References

The Radiators (Australian band) albums
1984 albums
EMI Records albums